Over its five seasons, The Ren & Stimpy Show featured a varied cast of characters, some who appeared in as few as one episode, and some who were practically regulars.

Ren and Stimpy

Ren Höek
Marland "Ren" T. Hoëk (voiced by John Kricfalusi in Seasons 1–2 and Adult Party Cartoon, Billy West in Seasons 3–5 and most laughter and screaming, and Chris Edgerly in Nicktoons MLB) is a scrawny "Asthma-Hound" Chihuahua with a fairly long, rat-like, pink tail (which constantly disappears due to the character's animation limits) and tan fur. Martin "Dr. Toon" Goodman of Animation World Magazine described Ren as "scrawny", "dyspeptic", and "violently psychotic". On some occasions, Ren "lost his mind" in a "cumulative process", resulting in Ren becoming, in Goodman's words, a "screaming klaxon, neon-pink eyes dilating into twin novae inches above his jagged, monolithic teeth". Andy Meisler of The New York Times described Ren as "adventurous", "intelligent", and "emotionally brittle".

Kricfalusi originally voiced Ren in a manner that he describes as "a bad imitation of Peter Lorre". Billy West said that he auditioned to play Ren; the creators of the series believed that having West voice Ren and Stimpy would give him too large of a workload. West would, however, take over Ren's voice after Nickelodeon fired Kricfalusi. Kricfalusi would return for the Spike TV episodes and unaired episodes of The Ren and Stimpy Show. In the pilot, Pierre Decelles provided Ren's signature diabolical laughter, while West performed Ren's maniacal laugh in the series.

Kricfalusi complained about Nickelodeon executives requesting for Ren to have "a softer side".

Bill Wray said that Ren was his favorite character to write for; Wray described Ren as "fun" because "you can make him mean". In 1993, he added that, "It drives me crazy when I tell people I work on the show and they always say, 'Make Ren meaner'".

Stimpson "Stimpy" J. Cat
Stimpson "Stimpy" J. Cat (voiced by Billy West in the series, Eric Bauza in Adult Party Cartoon) is a 3-year-old fat, red and white Manx cat (described by George Liquor as a "Cornish Rex Hound" to enter him in a dog show) with a large blue nose, purple eyelids, no tail, white gloves with fingernails on them, human-style buttocks, flat feet and a brain the size of a peanut (despite some intelligence, such as when cooking and inventing). Martin "Dr. Toon" Goodman of Animation World Magazine described Stimpy as "obese" and "brain-damaged". Andy Meisler of The New York Times described Stimpy as "barrel-chested" and "good-natured".

Stimpy's trademark facial expression is a blissfully ignorant smile with his tongue flopping out. Most of the time when he gets excited, he says his famous catchphrase, "Oh, joy!" or simply "Joy". He also has a strong attachment to his "first material possession" which is a litter box (given to him in the pilot episode) and even though Ren destroys it (by bashing it on his head in "Fire Dogs" or dumping it in acid in "Ren's Bitter Half"), Stimpy always reacts strongly to it by crying, panicking or fainting, though it always appears again in some later episode. Stimpy is named after an art school classmate of Kricfalusi, whose nickname was "Stimpy Cadogen" ("Killer Cadogen" was Stimpy's pseudonym in several episodes, and in a few others he is referred to as Stimpleton Cadogen). Billy West, who voiced Stimpy, said that he based Stimpy's voice on a "sped up" Larry Fine of The Three Stooges. West described Stimpy as one of his favorite characters. Eric Bauza voiced Stimpy in the Ren & Stimpy "Adult Party Cartoon" because West believed that the series had no humor and that voicing Stimpy in it would damage his career, as West later said in an interview.

Stimpy likes to create destructive electronic devices and feels a fixation for "sensory pleasures of fresh kitty litter".

Bill Wray described Stimpy as his favorite character to draw. Wray said that Stimpy has "a huge range of emotion".

Mr. Horse
Mr. Horse (voiced by John Kricfalusi in Seasons 1–2 and Adult Party Cartoon, Billy West in Seasons 3–5) was one of the most popular characters, appearing in many episodes in a wide variety of non-continuous roles. Mr. Horse has variously been a victim of a fall from a skyscraper, a GI returning from war in love with a sheep, a dog-show judge, a neighbor hiding a dark past, and a tester for Gritty Kitty cat litter. He has also been portrayed as a psychiatrist.

Mr. Horse is anthropomorphic, similar to the title characters—he is physically a full-sized male horse, but he usually stands on two legs and speaks. Mr. Horse is typically depicted as a straight-talking, thoughtful and serious character. He can also be cynical and disgruntled, and on occasion is merely a horse. His catchphrase is "No sir, I don't like it". He in fact does say other things in response to Stimpy in the Gritty Kitty Litter commercial.

Appearances
 Mr. Horse first appeared in the episode "Stimpy's Big Day/The Big Shot" as a tester for Gritty Kitty Litter, a brand of cat litter endorsed by Stimpy. Mr. Horse greatly prefers Gritty Kitty over the other leading brand, proving that Gritty Kitty can stand up to use by a horse.
 He next showed up in "Fire Dogs", as part of a Mrs. Buttloaves's animal menagerie that needed saving; when she dropped him out of her high-rise apartment window, Ren and Stimpy attempt to catch him with a lifesaving net. Due to his size, Mr. Horse's fall is not softened by the net and both his legs are broken. He drags himself away (to the tune "When Johnny Comes Marching Home") and is then interviewed by a reporter. When asked about his feelings on the fall, Mr. Horse thinks long and hard about it, then utters his catchphrase, "No, sir, I didn't like it", and continues to drag himself along.
 Mr. Horse had a brief cameo in "Svën Höek". Upon depositing a quarter in a slot in the living room wall, Stimpy is treated to a powerful leg kick from Mr. Horse to his head that sends him careening across the room.
 In "Rubber Nipple Salesmen", Mr. Horse is one of the prospective customers Ren and Stimpy speak to while selling the titular products door to door. Mr. Horse is shown breaking character here – his usual straightforward, stern demeanor was replaced by a nervous, panicky paranoia, and he alluded to hiding a dark past. He is seen wearing pants, gloves and a cap made of rubber, and is afraid that the FBI had sent Ren and Stimpy to find him. It appears he has a walrus captive with him, as the walrus whispers "Call the police" to the salesmen.
 In "The Great Outdoors", when Ren eats a meat pill without adding water first as Stimpy advised, it takes the effect of Mr. Horse growing inside of him, which stretches Ren's body and Mr. Horse's shape is seen. Mr. Horse then turns to the camera and says "No, sir, I don't like it".
 In “Stimpy’s Fan Club”, Mr. Horse appears at the end whenever Ren was crying to Stimpy because he wrote the letter to Ren. He appears at the house’s window along with 3 other people.
 Mr. Horse was featured in two shorts at the beginning and end of the episode "A Visit to Anthony". In the first, he plays a GI (at the rank of Private E-2) returning from an unspecified war. He is interviewed by Ren Hoëk, Ace Reporter, who asks him a series of questions about the war. When asked by the reporter if the sheep in his arms is his fiancée, Mr. Horse snaps back, "No, man, it's my sheep!"
 In the second, he plays the spokesman for the United Nations, with Ren sitting beside him. This highlights the complete lack of continuity between any Mr. Horse roles. The entire short is a set-up for him to say his catchphrase, but instead he says "Las cucarachas entran, pero no pueden salir" (The cockroaches go in, but they can't get out), which Ren, who turns out to be his translator, repeats as "No, sir, he doesn't like it".
 In "Out West", Mr. Horse appears as the horse of Abner and Ewalt when Ren and Stimpy travel out west. Abner and Ewalt are seeking horse thieves to hang, so they convince the pair to steal their horse. However, indicating that he's been stolen many times before, Mr. Horse grumbles about the "old steal-the-horse bit again" when the pair mount him and trudges on two legs (with Ren and Stimpy still on his back) to Abner and Ewalt, where he must carefully remind them he is stolen, and therefore the dog and cat duo are horse thieves.
 In "Dog Show", Mr. Horse appears as the pre-judge in the contest, that is, the judge who decides which dogs are unworthy of even entering the competition. Any animal deemed unworthy is rejected and thrown as a repast to a massive sleeping bull-dog. Stimpy is nearly given such a fate for having too smooth of a butt until George Liquor aggressively insists he be let through.
 In "Jerry the Belly Button Elf", Mr. Horse shows up as a party guest. He and the other party guests arrive at Ren and Stimpy's place after Stimpy's whole body is sucked inward from constantly fiddling with his belly button, after Ren repeatedly warned him not to do so.
 In "Insomniac Ren", Mr. Horse shows up to Ren and Stimpy's place as Ren's golfing buddy, as well as Muddy Mudskipper and Haggis MacHaggis. But Ren still has a hard time falling asleep by dawn and he offers Mr. Horse, Muddy, Haggis and Stimpy five bucks each to help him get some shut-eye. They then proceed to flog him with their golf clubs behind a closed door. In lieu of falling asleep, Ren ends up unconscious or comatose, as Stimpy shushes to the audience for much quietness and mentions when he, and the other golfers leave.
 In "Space Dogged", a medium-sized framed picture of Mr. Horse is seen among the items that Stimpski (a Russian version of Stimpy) tosses into the fireplace inside a space capsule to provide more fuel when it begins to falter.
 In "Dinner Party", Mr. Horse is among the guests at a party in a mansion. Prior to that, he's seen throwing darts when Stimpy visits him for an invite and at one point Mr. Horse throws a dart that gets embedded in Stimpy's forehead.
 In "Terminal Stimpy", Mr. Horse appears as a pilot coming out of an airplane's restroom saying "Man, these airplane foods really go through ya", succeeding a scene of an airplane part that fell off, through the roof and into a basement where it lands on Stimpy, as he's killed for the eighth time and after being seen lighting a match in front of a furnace.
 Mr. Horse returns in two Adult Party Cartoon episodes, appearing in major roles as a psychiatrist, whom upon declaring Ren insane (after Ren tells the whole truth what he did to Stimpy) is nearly beaten to death by him with the butt of his gun and a wild dog attack in "Ren Seeks Help" and a doctor in "Stimpy's Pregnant".

Powdered Toast Man

Powdered Toast Man (voiced by Gary Owens in most appearances, Darrin J. Sargent in the first "Powdered Toast Man" commercial, Corey Burton in Nicktoons MLB, David Kaye in Nickelodeon All-Star Brawl and Nickelodeon Kart Racers 3: Slime Speedway, Michael Berger in Smite), is a melodramatic superhero and a spokesperson for Powdered Toast, the breakfast treat that "tastes just like sawdust". He was based on a Frank Zappa-inspired character called Studebacher Hoch, from the song "Billy the Mountain". The character appeared in various Powdered Toast commercials within The Ren & Stimpy Show, and starred in two of its episodes: "Powdered Toast Man vs. Waffle Woman" and "Powdered Toast Man" (with Frank Zappa as "the Pope"). Powdered Toast Man hides his true identity behind the disguise of Pastor Toastman, a youth deacon.

Powers and abilities
Powdered Toast Man is endowed with various abilities and like many superheroes, has a mysterious background and an alter ego. The character's catch phrase is "Leave everything to me".

Powdered Toast Man can fly, either by releasing flatulence, or by inserting his head into a special toaster and launching from it, or merely by pushing off from the ground. He also flies backwards. He can hover in mid-air as well. His powers include some offensive weapons: high-velocity raisins shot from his mouth, hyper-corrosive croutons fired from his armpit, butter pats that are launched from the top of his head, and hyper-acidic marmalade from his navel. There are several signals that alert Powdered Toast Man to danger: his tongue phone, the inflation of his briefs, the dissipation of the toast particles in his head, or the reading of emergency messages encoded in slices of olive loaf.

He is apparently made entirely of Powdered Toast, as he can produce fully formed similar toast by flicking his wrist or by separating his head (which is made of two pieces of toast) and scraping the interior with a butter knife. His head is therefore depicted as being made of two identical pieces of toast, each complete with a face.

By day, Powdered Toast Man is Pastor Toastman, a "cool youth deacon". His disguise is composed of a pair of thick black spectacles and a pastor's collar, a possible parody of Superman's thinly disguised alter ego, Clark Kent. Pastor Toastman's office also serves as his headquarters, and he is served by a lovely young female assistant named "Catholic High School Girl" and it is strongly suggested that the two have a romantic relationship.

Accomplishments
Most of Powdered Toast Man's accomplishments are dubious and pyrrhic - if he ever succeeds it is usually accidentally, and at the cost of unintentionally inflicting havoc on someone else. Additionally, he fights for the sake of Ignorance and Prejudice.

He saves a kitten from being run over, at the cost of an airliner (which he shot down), and a truck (which was flattened by the airliner). It appears no one is killed in the crash, as the occupants of the plane seem cheerful and happy to see Powdered Toast Man despite their wounds. Responding to another mission, he throws the kitten offscreen, where it is presumably run over by another vehicle (we hear the screech of tires and then a crash),
He fights Spider-Man once, after being turned evil by the evil Dr. Dough-naught, and Spider-Man gets Powdered Toast Man working for good again, by using milk which stops PTM being crunchy. This adventure appears in the licensed comic book published by Marvel Comics.
He saves the Pope (voiced by Frank Zappa) from the clutches of Muddy Mudskipper. Why or how Muddy kidnapped the pope is unclear, but it is clear that after Powdered Toast Man frees the pope from the barrel of TNT he was strapped to, he places Muddy there in his stead and ties him up.
When the President of the United States accidentally gets his private parts caught in his own pants zipper, Powdered Toast Man frees him - in a very painful way. Though grateful, the President is incapacitated, and Powdered Toast Man steps in as Commander-in-Chief. While in office (having somehow avoided the entire line-in-wait to fill in for the Chief Executive), he heats the Oval Office with some dusty old papers, which include the Bill of Rights and the Constitution. (The scene where he tosses the documents into the fire is cut on Nickelodeon.)
Powdered Toast Man responded on numerous occasions to the plight of Ren and Stimpy when the dog and cat duo had run out of Powdered Toast, producing more for them with a flick of his wrist or a scrape of his head. It is implied that this is the usual method that Ren and Stimpy get Powdered Toast when they run out, because it doesn't "taste right" unless Powdered Toast Man exits with his traditional passing of gas.
He is also a very popular figure with children. Responding to a request from sickly "Little Johnny" about being able to meet the President, he actually manages to bring the President to him. In trying to get to Little Johnny on time before his nap, the President was vaporized by the massive speed of Powdered Toast Man. He also managed to save the child out of the hands of his apparent nemesis "Waffle Woman", at the cost of destroying most of the Earth. On one occasion, in a Powdered Toast commercial, he encounters a little boy and a girl who are flying, and reminds them that "children can't fly". The children panic and go plummeting and Powdered Toast Man saves them at the last second.
When carrying passengers on his backside, he asks them, "Are you clinging tenaciously to my buttocks?" before flying off.

Powdered Toast
The product named after Powdered Toast Man is true to its name — toast in powder form. Throwing doubt as to its appeal, toast is usually served warm, but powdered toast is room temperature.

The product comes in a can with an aerated top, allowing the toast to be "sprinkled" out in a manner similar to that of shredded Parmesan cheese. The powder somehow comes together, forming a piece of toast that can be consumed. Perhaps itself a commentary on the obsession of American culture with quickly prepared pre-made foods, it seems to take more time to "make" a piece of cold, sawdust-tasting Powdered Toast than it would to toast a piece of bread.

Though it's "jam-packed with Vitamin F", Powdered Toast doesn't make children smarter.

In the first commercial, at the beginning of "Robin Höek/Nurse Stimpy", Ren asks Stimpy, "Isn't he wonderful?" Stimpy then says, "Why, He's TOAST-A-RIFIC!"

Muddy Mudskipper
Muddy Mudskipper (voiced by Harris Peet) is a mudskipper (a species of fish capable of crawling out of water and breathing air through its skin) with the voice and personality of a grizzled vaudeville comedian who hosts an afternoon kids' show.

Muddy is an archetype — the old, jaded comedian who is outstanding at being "on" when on stage but sour and dissatisfied off-stage. There are certain parallels between Muddy and Krusty the Clown from The Simpsons — both have television shows that may or may not be for children, both shower their co-stars with abuse, and behind the scenes they are less than pleasant to be around. He calls everyone he meets "a lousy bum".

Besides being a huge television star, Muddy has dabbled in villainy, at one point kidnapping the Pope (voiced by Frank Zappa) before being foiled by Powdered Toast Man. His name is a parody of Woody Woodpecker.

The show's theme song (written by John Kricfalusi, Bob Camp & Charlie Brissette) plays up Muddy's particular physical traits.

Appearances
 In "Stimpy's Big Day/The Big Shot", Muddy is the namesake star of The Muddy Mudskipper Show. After Stimpy's epic ode to Gritty Kitty Litter lands him the co-star slot on the show, the actual cartoon is revealed to be a direct rip-off of Yogi Bear, with Stimpy as Yogi and Muddy as Ranger Smith.
 In "Powdered Toast Man", Muddy appears as a villain who has kidnapped the Pope.
 In "Royal Canadian Kilted Yaksmen", several mudskippers with the same character models as Muddy appear during the animal sing along.
 In "Insomniac Ren", Muddy, Mr. Horse and Haggis MacHaggis arrive at Ren and Stimpy's place the next morning so Ren can go golfing with them. However, Ren has trouble getting rest, therefore he offers them each five dollars to knock him out literally with their golf clubs. They accept the offer, as well as Stimpy who awakes when he hears this, and they send Ren into a coma. The others then depart to go golfing without him.
 In "My Shiny Friend", Muddy Mudskipper and his own show are referenced on a TV and later, Stimpy, after becoming obsessed with, addicted to and finally overdosing on watching too much TV, has a nightmare involving Muddy, who attacks him, then a giant version of Muddy chases him. In another chase scene, giant Muddy is now a huge TV with his mouth on the screen (or for the screen) and legs, and the nightmare ends with Stimpy falling into the TV's mouth, and being eaten.
 In "Ren Needs Help", Muddy is one of the various patients at a mental institution. He and a yak (possibly one of the yaks from "The Royal Canadian Kilted Yaksmen") are there because the yak claims that Muddy constantly incites and excites him by saying the word "cheese" around him, which sends him into a frenzy each time and he rubs (and eventually wears off) his rear end with a cheese grater.
 In "Dinner Party", Muddy is among the guests at a party in a mansion. Prior to that, he's seen in prison, pulling a lever to a machine that presses license plates. When Stimpy appears and hands him an invitation card, Muddy pulls the lever once again and accidentally presses (and flattens) Stimpy's hand, and arm.
 In "Terminal Stimpy", Muddy may have been killed off for good because his car was struck by Stimpy's and he was gravely injured and asked Stimpy a few favors before passing on, his final request was to be skipped across the road into the pond nearby he ended up being struck by a bus before he could reach the pond, he was last seen stuck to the front of the bus saying "I got another favor to ask you".

Muddy's lines would also be used as archive recording from these last three episodes for Nickelodeon 3D Movie Maker.

Mr. and Mrs. Pipe
Mr. and Mrs. Pipe (voiced by Billy West and Cheryl Chase) are a 1950s' sitcom-styled white suburban couple who are seen only from the waist down. Mr. Pipe is typically seen with a pipe and clad in a bathrobe, slippers and black socks supported by sock-suspenders. He loves to wear rubber nipples on his knees and farts at inappropriate moments. Mrs. Pipe appears to wear a dress and nondescript women's shoes. Their first appearance was in "The Boy Who Cried Rat", in which Ren and Stimpy got a job catching mice for them. In "Big Baby Scam", it seems they have two children named Eugene and Shawn.

The Announcer Salesman
The Announcer Salesman (also known as "That Guy") serves as the multi-purpose loudmouth in the Ren and Stimpy show. Sometimes, he is a salesman ("Feud for Sale", "To Salve and Salve Not!".) Other times, he is a narrator, an announcer, a dog-show judge, a real estate agent, etc. The character is never referred to by any name in the series, but the name of "Hey, It's That Guy" seems to be the official name given by West, who also voiced him. He first appeared in "Space Madness" provoking Stimpy to press the history eraser button. He bears a slight resemblance to the Genie from Disney's Aladdin. He had a moustache in "House of Next Tuesday". He was voiced by Billy West.

Haggis MacHaggis
Haggis MacHaggis is a short, bald stereotypical Scotsman. At one point, he was a cartoon star, but low ratings forced him out into the street. He is voiced by Alan Young, who utilizes the same voice as Scrooge McDuck.

Wilbur Cobb
Wilbur Cobb is a demented, decaying old man who was once the foremost cartoon producer in the world. He speaks in malapropisms and suffers from a malady that results in body parts falling off. In the episode "Stimpy's Cartoon Show", Ren and Stimpy show Cobb their own film "I Like Pink" (with Explodey the Pup) in hopes the powerful producer will give them their big break. Voiced by Jack Carter, his final appearance was in "The Last Temptation", where he was the gardener for God. John Kricfalusi originally wanted his name to be Raymond Spum (a reference to the pseudonym that he used in episodes he considered unsatisfactory), but after his termination from the series Nickelodeon renamed him Wilbur Cobb after the story editor.

The Fire Chief
The Fire Chief has a psychotic hatred for circus midgets and a penchant for slamming his fire axe into concrete as a response to answering the door.

He was voiced by Harris Peet in the entire original series and at the beginning of the character's appearance in the Adult Party Cartoon. After transforming into a caricature of Ralph Bakshi, Bakshi himself voiced the character. Kricfalusi had originally based the character on Bakshi.

Mrs. Buttloaves
Mrs. Buttloaves is a morbidly obese and homely old woman dressed in a bulging pink night gown and hair curlers. She first appeared in "Fire Dogs". She is voiced by John Kricfalusi for the show's first two seasons and subsequently by Billy West.

George Liquor, American
George Liquor is an ultra-patriotic American and is so conservative that he thinks Republicans are Communists. When episodes featuring him were aired on Nickelodeon, his family name was edited out. Instead, the scene would pause and a record-scratching sound effect would be played in place of the word "Liquor". Many story pitches featuring Liquor were vetoed by Nickelodeon due to their dislike for the character. After Kricfalusi's termination from the show, the rights to the character were returned to him.

According to Kricfalusi, he's Ren and Stimpy's official owner. He was voiced by Michael Pataki, but Harris Peet voiced him as two pre-George characters in "The Boy Who Cried Rat" and "Black Hole".

Other characters
Abner Dimwit and Ewalt Nitwit are a pair of incredibly stupid hillbillies who are sheriff and deputy of a small Wild West town. They have a strong proclivity for hanging, so much so that they eventually hang themselves in absence of a suitable hangee. When Abner and Ewalt think about something, even the most simple of problems, the theme from Jeopardy! plays. Ewalt was voiced by Bob Camp, and Abner was voiced by both Jim Smith and Bob Camp.
Svën Höek is Ren's German or Scandinavian cousin whom Ren has not seen since they were in the whelping box together. Ren longs to have an intellectual conversation with his cousin, but much to his horror, Svën is even stupider than Stimpy — they even belong to the same fraternal organization, the "Loyal Order of Stupid" — and he forms an instant bond with him. Stimpy and Svën engage in idiocy with Ren's things when he goes to work. When Ren returns, he sees the mess and finds them playing "Don't Whiz on the Electric Fence". In spite, Ren does the very thing the game says not to do, sending them all to Hell. He only appeared in the eponymous episode (season 2, episode 4) of the original cartoon but made further appearances in the comic book and a cameo appearance in the Season 3 episode "Jerry the Bellybutton Elf". Billy West voiced the character. John Kricfalusi wrote that he took many European stereotypes and used them in parody to form Svën. He claims that Europeans who watched the show did not feel offended by the character and liked the show.
Waffle Woman is Powdered Toast Man's nemesis and appears in the episode "Powdered Toast Man vs. Waffle Woman". She was voiced by Gail Matthius.
The Shaven Yak is the shaven icon of Yak Shaving Day. He rides through the sky in a canoe and is capable of emerging from and disappearing into sink and tub drains. Although he is shaven, he is on a constant vigil against getting a five o'clock shadow.
Kowalski, Bubba, and Jiminy Lummox are of the race known as lummoxes. Kowalski appeared in the season 2 episode "Fake Dad", in which Ren & Stimpy participate in a youth mentoring-type program. Instead of a child to mentor, they receive a convicted criminal who behaves much like a very large, very violent child who only eats meat. Kowalski is possibly based on a similar character of the same name from Fredrick Forsyth's political thriller The Day of the Jackal and professional wrestler Killer Kowalski and is voiced by Harris Peet. Bubba is Ren's nephew who appeared in "The Cat Who Laid the Golden Hairball". Jiminy Lummox serves as the manifestation of Stimpy's conscience. When lent to Ren, Jiminy correct his behavior by mercilessly punishing him after any bad deed, big or small; he smashed Ren's face in with a guitar as penance for his earlier crimes. As a spoof of Jiminy Cricket, Jiminy Lummox sings a song similar to "When You Wish Upon a Star". He was voiced by Stan Freberg.
The Lout Brothers are two large, very muscular wrestlers who take on Ren and Stimpy in "Mad Dog Hoëk". They dominate the boys, which Ren does not appreciate, cowering in fear, while Stimpy enjoys the match despite the pain and humiliation. In the end, the two throw the fight, only to threaten to treat Ren and Stimpy even worse in the next match.
Stinky Wizzleteats is a character whose design and voice characterization are based on the folk balladeer Burl Ives. He is the spirit of Yaskmas and sings the recorded version of the "Happy Happy Joy Joy" song, digressing into demented and furious rants ("I told you I'd shoot but you didn't believe me! Why didn't you believe me?"), taken from Ives' movie The Big Country in between the chorus. He delivers sausage and pre-chewed gum to children on Yaksmas Eve, flying through the sky on a sausage cart driven by the Shaven Yak. Voiced by John Kricfalusi at first, then by Billy West and Bob Camp after Kricfalusi was fired.
Reverend Jack Cheese is a brooding, deeply-troubled itinerant preacher with the words "PITY" and "SELF PITY" tattooed on the knuckles of his right and left hands reminiscent of Reverend Harry Powell in the film Night of the Hunter. He hires Ren & Stimpy to assist in his travelling minstrel show where they evangelize the gospel of meat. Plays a one-stringed guitar. Voiced by Frank Gorshin. He is loosely based on series creator John Kricfalusi.
Jose Poo is an overweight Hispanic entrepreneur in the Adult Party Cartoon episodes. He owns a bar in "Onward and Upwards", a shop in "Naked Beach Frenzy", and makes cameos as "Mexican Elvis" and the owner of "Chunkey Butt" Ice Cream in "Altruists" and "Stimpy's Pregnant". Based on Spumco Canada artist Jose Pou.
The Nerve Ending Fairy is a character who appears when Ren loses all his teeth, leaving his mouth full of "stinky gum holes". Stimpy, who has perfect dental hygiene, convinces Ren to pull out his nerve endings with tweezers and put them under his pillow for the Nerve Ending Fairy. As Ren and Stimpy sleep that night, out the window you can see a beautiful fairy appear, but a closer look shows that it's really a dirty old man who wiggles his toes when he says, "I smell something stinky!" The Nerve Ending Fairy takes the nerve endings from under Ren's pillow and puts them on the back side of his neck. He doesn't have any money, so instead gives him a ball of lint. He resembles Old Man Hunger, yet there are differences: the Nerve Ending Fairy wears a crown instead of a drumstick and has a darker beard. He was voiced by Billy West.
The Bloody Head Fairy is a minor character in the season 2 episode "Haunted House". He takes the Bloody Head off of Ren's head and gives him two dimes, putting them in his ear. When he disappears, Ren wakes up and starts to panic, telling Stimpy that there is something in his ear. Stimpy calms him down as he extracts the dimes from Ren's ear. He reassures Ren, telling him it is just a couple of dimes and then tells him that he "just got a visit from The Bloody Head Fairy".
Jasper the Dog usually appears as a white-furred, red-nosed dog with blue spots; Jasper has been in a number of episodes. His first appearance ("Big House Blues") had him calmly explaining that "you don't wake up...from the big sleep". All the rest of his appearances were cameos in which he appeared as a normal dog, the leader of the Hermit Union, and even the senior officer of the Royal Canadian Kilted Yaksmen.
Victor is a huge boy with orange hair who always wears a white collar, black tie, and sweater vest. Though he dresses sharp, he is actually the school bully and he beats up Ren and Stimpy as well as a young boy named Anthony. He is seen punching Stimpy in the stomach over and over, punctuating each blow with "Happy...Happy...Joy...Joy", and twisting Ren's head until his neck broke. The only person proud of Victor is his father, who picks him up from school in a station wagon with a sign on the driver's door reading "Victor's Dad". Victor's first appearance was in "A Visit to Anthony". Victor and his father made another appearance, offering an insecure Stimpy a pair of underpants if he can pass their initiation. Stimpy succeeded and was given the underpants by Victor's dad. They tossed Stimpy out the station wagon and laughed but, not paying attention to the road, they drive off a cliff. Victor was voiced by Danny Cooksey.
Jerry the Bellybutton Elf is a one eyed sea green elf that dwells within the confines of Stimpy's bellybutton. When Stimpy served Lint Loaf to Jerry, the Bellybutton Elf flips out and reveals himself to be a giant porkchop-like monster named Adonis, Lord of Chaos. He was voiced by Gilbert Gottfried.
Anthony is a boy with unusually round glasses. His favorite cartoon characters are Ren & Stimpy, who to come to his house after he writes a letter to them. Anthony's first appearance is in "A Visit to Anthony". Anthony was designed after and voiced by Anthony Raspanti, who wrote one of the first fan letters to the series.
Anthony's Dad appears in "A Visit to Anthony". He's an all-American dad, blue-collar worker, strict, ill-tempered, extremely protective of his son, and has an intense hatred for cartoons, especially Ren and Stimpy. He was voiced by Randy Quaid.
Brainchild, designed by Bob Camp, is a genius riding an "anuscycle". He appears in "Blazing Entrails". Brainchild inflates Stimpy so Ren could rescue his brain. Bill Mumy voiced Brainchild.
The Ghost appears to be based on Droopy Dog and his face appears to be modeled after Elmer Fudd. He appeared in "Haunted House", in which he tries to scare Ren and Stimpy. When his attempts fail, he commits suicide by drinking poison and is reborn as a heavyset African-American jazz musician. He is voiced by Billy West.
The Baboon appears in many episodes. He is very violent, aggressive, and wild. In "Stupid Sidekick Union", Ren replaces Stimpy with the Baboon as his stupid sidekick, but it doesn't work too well as Ren is too afraid to hit him when he does something stupid like he would with Stimpy. When Ren finally does hit him, the Baboon mauls him.
The Dogcatcher appeared in "Big House Blues". Voiced by Jim Smith.
The Barrette Beret Girl Scouts were three bully Girl Scouts who Ren and Stimpy tried to join with in "Eat My Cookies". After Stimpy gambled away their cookie money, the girls task them into achieving impossible tasks for badges, with only Stimpy being successful. The lead scout was voiced by Rosie O'Donnell, while the other two were both voiced by Cheryl Chase. 
Phil: A bulldog who gets put to sleep in "Big House Blues", although he appears in "Dog Show" later on.
Ben and Stumpy: These were supposed to be imposters with sock puppets of Ren and Stimpy hired by Haggis MacHaggis, but they became popular. They appeared in "Hard Times for Haggis".
Marvin: Haggis' overweight, dim-witted butler.
Wacky: Haggis' pet Scottish Terrier dog.
Ralph: A masochistic talking fly. Whenever the fly appears it is put through physical torture by Ren.
Stinky: Stimpy's homesick fart and son in "Son of Stimpy". He was voiced by Billy West. 
Magic Nose Goblins: The collection of Stimpy's mucous he keeps under a table. According to John Kricfalusi and Vincent Waller in the DVD commentary, the name "Magic Nose Goblins" came after Nickelodeon advised against calling them "boogers".
Tooth Beaver: Appearing in "Ren's Toothache", he gnawed on the nerve ending of Ren's tooth because the latter never brushed his teeth. When all of Ren's teeth disintegrated, he ejected himself from Ren's gums as they proved to be even too disgusting for him. 
Little Girl: A sweet little girl who adopts Ren and Stimpy from the pound in the pilot "Big House Blues". She initially only wanted Ren after mistaking him for a poodle (when in reality, he was covered in Stimpy's hairballs). But after Ren realizes that Stimpy will be left behind to be put to sleep, he easily convinces her to adopt both of them. She was voiced by Cheryl Chase.
Little Girl's Mom: A doting and loving woman in "Big House Blues" who overwhelms Stimpy and particularly Ren with pet items. It was she who gave Stimpy his beloved litter box, much to Ren's disgust. She was voiced by animator Lynne Naylor.
Walrus: Appears in "Rubber Nipple Salesmen". When Ren and Stimpy drop by Mr. Horse's house, he pulls out the Walrus who tells them to call the police in a whisper.
Sid: A tiny, cigar-smoking, sleazy dog-like clown who Stimpy raised in "Stimpy's Pet". He was voiced by Phil Hartman doing a Jack Nicholson impression.

References

The Ren & Stimpy Show characters
Ren and Stimpy Show characters, List of The